The men's individual recurve competition at the 2005 World Archery Championships took place in June 2005 in Madrid, Spain. 143 archers entered the competition. Following a qualifying 144 arrow FITA round on 22 June, the top 64 archers qualified for the 6-round knockout tournament, drawn according to their qualification round scores. The semi-finals and finals then took place on 27 June.

Qualifying
The following archers were the leading 8 qualifiers:

Full draw

Section 1

Section 2

Section 3

Section 4

Finals

References

2005 World Archery Championships